The Serviciul pentru Intervenţii şi Acţiuni Speciale (Special Actions and Intervention Service, SIAS) is a Romanian Police task force created in 1995 as part of the Counter-Organized crime Squad.

Its roles include seizing and neutralizing dangerous or armed criminals, and handling hostage crisis. SIAS also helps to rescue people in disasters in any area of the country in cooperation with the aviation unit of the Ministry of Administration and Interior.

SIAS ensures the protection of policemen, witnesses and others involved in criminal investigations if they have been pressurised or threatened. SIAS also ensures protection of the heads of the Ministry of Internal Affairs, General Inspectorate of the Romanian Police, chiefs of police of other states or foreign delegations visiting Romania. SIAS takes part in extradition operations and handles those extradited to Romania.

The bomb squad division of SIAS deals with explosive devices placed in public or private places. It also carries out specialized technical control with the purpose of preventing the disturbance of public peace and order by using explosive means and contributes to the education of the population to minimise the risk of harm by explosives.

See also
 Romanian Police

External links
  Official website

Romanian Police
Special forces of Romania